The pudendal canal (also called Alcock's canal) is an anatomical structure in the pelvis through which the internal pudendal artery, internal pudendal veins, and the pudendal nerve pass.

Structure
The pudendal canal is formed by the fascia of the obturator internus muscle, or  obturator fascia.

It encloses the following:
 Internal pudendal artery.
 Internal pudendal veins.
 Pudendal nerve.

These vessels and nerve cross the pelvic surface of the obturator internus.

Clinical significance 
Pudendal nerve entrapment can occur when the pudendal nerve is compressed while it passes through the pudendal canal.

History 
The pudendal canal is also known as Alcock's canal, named after Benjamin Alcock.

Additional images

See also
 Femoral canal
 Inguinal canal

References

External links
 
 
  — "The Female Perineum: Contents of the Pudendal Canal"
 Diagram at pudendal.info
 
 

Perineum